Gelbis is a Somali wedding celebration where the bride and the groom are taken to the streets, especially on horses or on cars with people singing and dancing in happy moods. Gelbis happens at night when the wedding is over and before the bride and the groom and their family dance and eat with each other. It mainly takes about at least two hours for Gelbis to finish and for the bride and groom to be brought to the house of the groom.

See also
Wedding customs by country

References

Somali culture
Wedding traditions